Town of South Brisbane was an electoral district of the Legislative Assembly in the Australian state of Queensland from 1860 to 1873.

Taking in areas of Brisbane south of the Brisbane River, it was a single member constituency and one of the original sixteen districts contested at the first colonial election in 1860. The district was renamed South Brisbane at the 1873 election.

Members for Town of South Brisbane

See also
 Electoral districts of Queensland
 Members of the Queensland Legislative Assembly by year
 :Category:Members of the Queensland Legislative Assembly by name

References

Former electoral districts of Queensland